Michel López Núñez (born November 5, 1976 in Pinar del Río) is a Cuban former amateur boxer, who won the Super Heavyweight bronze medal at the 2004 Summer Olympics. He is the older brother of Mijaín López Núñez, a Cuban Greco-Roman wrestler.

Career
Olympic Results were:
Defeated Rustam Saidov (Uzbekistan) (18-13)
Defeated Jason Estrada (USA) (21-7)
Lost to Mohamed Aly (Egypt) (16-18)

In 2007 he lost at the National Championships to young Robert Alfonso.

External links

1976 births
Living people
Heavyweight boxers
Super-heavyweight boxers
Boxers at the 2003 Pan American Games
Boxers at the 2004 Summer Olympics
Olympic boxers of Cuba
Olympic bronze medalists for Cuba
Olympic medalists in boxing
Cuban male boxers
Medalists at the 2004 Summer Olympics
Pan American Games silver medalists for Cuba
Pan American Games medalists in boxing
People from Pinar del Río
Central American and Caribbean Games gold medalists for Cuba
Competitors at the 2006 Central American and Caribbean Games
Central American and Caribbean Games medalists in boxing
Medalists at the 2003 Pan American Games
21st-century Cuban people